Wu Jianren (T: 吳趼人, S: 吴趼人, P: Wú Jiǎnrén, W: Wu Chien-jen; 1866–1910), also known as Wu Woyao (T: 吳沃堯, S: 吴沃尧, P: Wú Wòyáo, W: Wu Wo-yao) was a Chinese writer of the late Qing period.  A native of Foshan, Guangdong province,  he is known for several novels, namely Bizarre Happenings Eyewitnessed over Two Decades and The Sea of Regret. Wu Jianren is a representative figure of modern Chinese novel for his innovation and technique. The period in which he created his works is ahead Lu Xun by at least one decade, and his technique about narrators and centralized character is ahead of other novels that was written at the same time. From 1902 to 1910, Wu Jianren wrote the most articles in the group of writers who responded to Liang Qichao's "revolution of Chinese novel". His novel 《二十年目睹之怪现状》(Bizarre Happenings Eyewitnessed over Two Decades) and 《九命奇冤》(strange grievance case of nine lives) has deeply influenced modern Chinese literature.

Life 
Wu Jianren was born in 1866, Foshan, Guangdong province. His great-great-grandfather, grandfather, and his father all works for the Qing government. Soon after he was born, his family changed his name from Baozhen to Woyao. Wu Jianren start to go to school when he was eight, then he enrolled in Foshan Academy(Foshan shuyuan) at the age of 12. He lived in poverty since his father passed away in 1882, at that time he was 17 years old. In 1883, 18 years old Wu Jianren moved to Shanghai and start working as a waiter in the tea house, clerk in Jiangnan Manufacture General Bureau(now known as Jiangnan shipyard). Since 1897, he started to edit 《字林沪报》(Zilin Shanghai news)、《采风报》(Wind collector news)、《奇新报》(Peculiar news)、《寓言报》(Fable news), etc. Later in 1906, he became the Chef editor of 《月月小说》(alternative title All-story monthly). Then, he continues his life as a writer, his work includes fables, biography, and opera. He has never been rich in his life; he died in October 1910 (45 years old) because the poverty and overwork.

Between 1902 and 1910, Wu Jianren start to publish his work. He used the knowledge that he learned in traditional Chinese study, created many great pieces of Novels-poetry, anecdotes, fiction criticism and joke collections. By the influence of Liang Qichao's "revolution of Chinese novel", he starts to writing the "New Novel". In those social novels, he uses irony to reflect his concern of the loss of traditional Chinese culture and shows social problems in China.

Writing style
Wu Jianren wrote novels for an audience who did not receive a classical education, and he used everyday vernacular speech in his works.

Wu Jianren recorded stories from newspapers that he could use as a source in his work within a notebook. Bao Tianxiao, the editor of early Republican journal Funu Shibao 妇女时报 and another novelist who wrote an account of Wu Jianren's notebook, used this technique to write Shanghai Chunqiu (上海春秋; Shanghai records).

In some of Wu Jianren's novel he let the self-conscious author-narrator lead readers to understand the fiction setting, sometimes he uses a prologue to help develop the fiction scene. Because he says that his story included some events that himself witnessed, so he can not write those work like other normal novels. Some scholars think Wu Jianren's work was inspired by Western translated novels. Such as "A mystery book of Liang Tianlai" was considered as Oriental Sherlock Holmes. They also believe in his work "strange grievance case of nine lives" that the special narrative technique in this novel was influenced by the writing style in Western novels.

Works
Bizarre Happenings Eyewitnessed over Two Decades (二十年目睹之怪現狀)
Sea of Regret (恨海)
Jiuming Qiyuan (strange grievance case of nine lives) (九命奇冤)
The New Story of the Stone (新石頭記)
《二十年目睹之怪现状》 (Bizarre Happenings Eyewitnessed over Two Decades) is one of the "Four Best Condemnation Novels in the Late Qing Dynasty". The story was about the story of main character 九死一生(a narrow escape from death). The twenty years in the novel was start since 九死一生(a narrow escape from death) father's death, and end in the fail of his business. The story shows reader a very comprehensive society in Qing dynasty. The novel not only talks how main character want to build his business, but also talks about many kind of people's life in Qing dynasty(thief, government agent, monk, etc.).

《九命奇冤》(strange grievance case of nine lives) is a novel that wrote based on 《梁天来警富奇书》(A mystery book of Liang Tianlai).

《新石头记》Xin shitou ji (The new story of the Stone) is a novel continued the story of  Cao Xueqin's novel《红楼梦》 (Dream of the red chamber). This is a fantasy story about Jia Baoyu exploring China in 1900s.

According to editors themselves《月月小说》(alternative title All-story monthly) is a magazine with a main idea that "We talk about all weird things, many kinds of articles; with people who have amazing ideas, talk about truth, make the society better and inspire people"

References

Des Forges, Alexander. "Anxiety, brand names, and wild chickens." In: Rojas, Carlos and Eileen Chow (editors). Rethinking Chinese Popular Culture: Cannibalizations of the Canon. Routledge, 8 December 2008. , 9780203886649.
Doleželová-Velingerová, Milena. "Chapter 38: Fiction from the End of the Empire to the Beginning of the Republic (1897–1916)" in: Mair, Victor H. (editor). The Columbia History of Chinese Literature''. Columbia University Press, 13 August 2013. p. 697-731. , 9780231528511.

External links
 
 

Qing dynasty novelists
1866 births
1910 deaths
Writers from Foshan
Chinese male novelists